The 2021 NCHC Tournament was the eighth tournament in league history. Typically the tournament is scheduled across two separate weekends in mid-march with quarterfinal games hosted on campus locations, while the final four games are played at the Xcel Energy Center in Saint Paul, Minnesota. However, on February 8, 2021, NCHC announced that the tournament would be played entirely in Grand Forks. By winning the tournament, North Dakota earned NCHC's automatic bid to the 2021 NCAA Division I Men's Ice Hockey Tournament.

Format
Due to the COVID-19 pandemic, changes to the traditional tournament format were made for this season. All games will be single-elimination as opposed to a best-of-three games quarterfinals, and no third-place game will occur. All eight conference teams participate in the tournament. Teams are seeded No. 1 through No. 8 according to their final conference standing, with a tiebreaker system used to seed teams with an identical number of points accumulated. The top four seeded teams each earn home ice and host one of the lower seeded teams.

The winners of the quarterfinals round series will advance to the NCHC Frozen Faceoff. Teams are re-seeded No. 1 through No. 4 according to the final regular season conference standings.

Standings

Bracket
Teams are reseeded for the Semifinals
* denotes overtime periods

Results

Quarterfinals

(1) North Dakota vs. (8) Miami

(2) St. Cloud State vs. (7) Colorado College

(3) Minnesota Duluth vs. (6) Western Michigan

(4) Omaha vs. (5) Denver

Semifinals

(1) North Dakota vs. (5) Denver

(2) St. Cloud State vs. (3) Minnesota Duluth

Championship

(1) North Dakota vs. (2) St. Cloud State

Tournament awards

Frozen Faceoff All-Tournament Team
F: Collin Adams (North Dakota)
F: Gavin Hain (North Dakota)
F: Riese Gaber* (North Dakota)
D: Nick Perbix (St. Cloud State)
D: Jake Sanderson (North Dakota)
G: Adam Scheel (North Dakota)
* Most Valuable Player(s)

References

NCHC Tournament
National Collegiate Hockey Conference Tournament
College sports in Minnesota
Ice hockey competitions in Saint Paul, Minnesota
NCHC Tournament
NCHC Tournament